Alexander Valeryanovich  Peskov; born February 13, 1962, Koryazhma, Arkhangelsk Oblast, RSFSR, USSR) is a Russia's popular entertainer. The artist calls his work  synchro-buffoonery.

In the Russian media, Alexander Peskov, often referred to as  King of Parody.

References

External links
 Official Website 
 Alexander Peskov's Interview

1962 births
Living people
People from Arkhangelsk Oblast
Russian male comedians
Russian parodists
Russian Academy of Theatre Arts alumni